Sumenu or Smenu (Egyptian: S(w)mnw) was an ancient Egyptian town located in Upper Egypt. It housed the most prominent early-Middle Kingdom sanctuary of the crocodile-god Sobek.

Identification

Uncertainties about the exact location of the city – tentatively identified with Gebelein or with Rizeiqat, the latter location being suggested by Gaston Maspero – seem to have been resolved thanks to archaeological excavations started in the late 1960s, which finally allowed to identify Sumenu with the modern town of Al-Mahamid Qibly, located between Armant and Gebelein.

It is almost certain that Sumenu has to be identified with Imiotru and thus also with the Crocodilopolis which was distinct from the one in the Faiyum and, according to Strabo's Geographica, was located between Hermonthis (Armant) and Aphroditopolis (Gebelein). It appears most likely that Sumenu was the toponym where the temple stood, while Imiotru/Crocodilopolis referred to the whole city; in later times, the "Sumenu" denomination became obsolete.

History
Earliest attestations of Sumenu dates back to the 11th Dynasty, and consist in references of a temple of "Sobek, lord of Sumenu", indirectly attesting that such temple was already existing at the time. Jean Yoyotte suggested that the flourishing of the cult of Sobek during the Middle Kingdom was due to the Theban origin of the 12th Dynasty pharaohs rather than their interest in the Faiyum region where Sobek was later associated. In fact, objects referring to Sobek of Sumenu became quite common during the early Middle Kingdom, and was only with Amenemhat III that the cult of Sobek at Sumenu lost its appeal in favor of “Sobek of Shedet”, the Greek Krokodeilópolis, located northward in the Faiyum.

The temple survived into the New Kingdom, when several pharaohs of the 18th Dynasty ordered works here, then gradually phased out in later times. Soon after 88 BCE, the temple was demolished and its materials reused in the nearby city of el-Tod.

References

Bibliography
Betrò, Marilina: Sobek a Sumenu in Pernigotti, Sergio & Zecchi, Marco (eds): Il coccodrillo ed il cobra. Aspetti dell'universo religioso egiziano nel Fayyum e altrove. Atti del colloquio, Bologna – 20/21 Aprile 2005. Imola, La Mandragora, pp. 91-102 (in Italian).

Cities in ancient Egypt
Archaeological sites in Egypt
Former populated places in Egypt